East Valley may refer to a location in the United States:

East Valley (Phoenix metropolitan area), the east side of the Phoenix metropolitan area in Arizona
East Valley, Nevada, a census-designated place
East Valley School District (Spokane), a school district in Spokane, Washington
East Valley Township, Marshall County, Minnesota
East San Jose, a neighborhood in San Jose, California